Hormidas Mayrand (August 15, 1858 – July 4, 1928) was a Canadian politician.

Born in St-Léon, Canada East, the son of Jean-Baptiste Mayrand (and grandson of Étienne Mayrand) and Marie Louise Lottinville, Mayrand was educated at the model school of St-Léon. A farmer by occupation, he was first elected to the House of Commons of Canada for the Quebec electoral district of Maskinongé in a 1903 by-election, after the sitting MP, Joseph-Hormisdas Legris, was called to the Senate of Canada. A Liberal, he was re-elected in the 1904 and 1908 elections. He was defeated in 1911 but was re-elected in 1917. He did not run in 1921 election. He was also mayor of St-Léon.

References
 
 The Canadian Parliament; biographical sketches and photo-engravures of the senators and members of the House of Commons of Canada. Being the tenth Parliament, elected November 3, 1904

1858 births
1928 deaths
Laurier Liberals
Liberal Party of Canada MPs
Mayors of places in Quebec
Members of the House of Commons of Canada from Quebec